Ville Moilanen (born 27 April 1999) is a Finnish professional footballer who plays as a midfielder for Kemi City.

Career
In September 2015, Moilanen joined Bradford City on a two-year deal.

In April 2021, Moilanen rejoined Kemi City, now playing in the Kakkonen.

References

External links

Profile at Finnish FA

1999 births
Living people
Finnish footballers
Kemi City F.C. players
IF Gnistan players
TP-47 players
Veikkausliiga players
Ykkönen players
Kakkonen players
Association football midfielders
Kolmonen players
Bradford City A.F.C. players
Expatriate footballers in England
Finnish expatriate footballers
Finnish expatriate sportspeople in England